Nechako may refer to:
Nechako River in British Columbia
Nechako Plateau
Nechako Country
Regional District of Bulkley-Nechako, British Columbia
Nechako Reservoir
Nechako Diversion
Nechako, British Columbia, a neighbourhood in Kitimat, British Columbia

See also
Nechacco, a paddle steamer